Jassim Swadi Fayadh  (born 15 December 1975 in Iraq) is a former Iraqi football player who last played for Al-Kahraba in Iraq.

Jassim Swadi is a left-footed player who is able to play anywhere in defence, midfield or even up front, started with Baghdad-based club Al-Nafat in 1991 before later moving across the capital to join Al-Shorta in 1993 and then to Al-Quwa Al-Jawiya in 1996.

He also played in England and Cyprus, where he won a league title.

International goals
Scores and results list Iraq's goal tally first.

References

External links
 
 
 Profile on Goalzz

1975 births
Living people
Iraqi footballers
Iraq international footballers
Iraqi expatriate footballers
Sportspeople from Baghdad
Apollon Limassol FC players
Macclesfield Town F.C. players
Cypriot First Division players
Expatriate footballers in Cyprus
Expatriate footballers in England
Al-Zawraa SC players
Al-Shorta SC players
Association football midfielders